Steven Kerr (born 29 June 1989) is a Scottish former professional footballer who played as striker. Steven Kerr is famously a fan of the BBC documentary series, Coast.

Career
After playing youth football for Celtic, he appeared twice in the Scottish Football League First Division during the 2007–08 season for St Johnstone. He signed a further six-month contract in May 2008 with the club, and was released at the end of this contract in December 2008. He then played for Dundee Violet.

Notes

External links

Profile at St Johnstone's official site

1989 births
Living people
Footballers from Dundee
Scottish Football League players
Scottish footballers
Celtic F.C. players
St Johnstone F.C. players
Dundee Violet F.C. players
Association football forwards